Asanda Lusaseni Mvana(born 31 December 1988) known professionally  as Msaki, is a South African composer, singer, and songwriter. Born and grew up in East London, during her childhood she was involved in musical activities. Her career in music began in 2008, at the age of 20, when she was a member of alternative  rock band while attending college.

Her debut Extended Play  Nal'ithemba   (2013) and debut solo studio album Zaneliza: How The Water Moves (2016), which was nominated for Best Adult Contemporary Album.

Early life
Asanda Lusaseni Mvana was born in East London, Eastern Cape in 1988. Her father was a DJ and grandmother  was a music composer. She attended Cathcart High School  and Nelson Mandela University before dropping  out  after one year. Mvana attended Rhodes University and obtained  Master of Fine Arts degree.

In 2008, she Joined The Patience alternative rock group based in East London and electro-experimental band Johnny Cradle based in Cape town. Following  year in 2009, she was guitarist  and lead vocalist for Kate and I duo formed  in Grahamstown.

In 2012, Msaki attended music school in North Carolina in the USA.

Career
She established her own record label, One Shushu Day Artistry and released her debut Extended Play Nal'ithemba, in 2013 produced by Cobus Van Dyk.
In 2016, she won ovation at 7th Standard Bank Ovation Awards and Gold Award First Place at Cape Town Fringe. Her single "Imfama Ziyabona" released in 2016, debuted  on  Metro FM Charts for 19 consecutive  weeks.

In June 2017, her debut album Zaneliza: How The Water Moves was released in South Africa. The album  was co-produced by Nduduzo Makhathini. To further promote her album she performed at National Art Festival. At the 23rd ceremony of South African Music Awards Zaneliza: How The Water Moves  was nominated for Best Adult Contemporary Album.

Msaki teamed up with South African DJ Prince Kaybee on a song titled "Fetch Your Life", which was released on February 8, 2019. The song debuted number one on iTunes Dance charts. In November  2019, her single "Pearls To Swine" featuring TRESOR and Kid X was released, bagged  nomination for Best Produced Video. She co-written "Undithatha Kancinci" single by Kelly Khumalo.

In October 22, Msaki released double single of "Fetch Your Life II" and "Mntakababa" featuring Kabza De Small and Focalistic. That same month she made a collaboration on platoon  compilation album African Lullabies Pt. 1. In November 19, her double  project Platinumb Heart, was released.

In December 2021, Msaki headlined to 14th Annual Mzansi Fela Festival along with Amanda Black, Zoë Modiga, and Mandisi Dyantyisa  was held in State Theatre, Guateng.

In January 2022, Msaki collaborated on a song "Own The Future" with Goodluck, Shekhinah, and YoungstaCPT. She also received a nomination for Female Vocalist of the Year at Global Music Awards Africa 2022.

In early February, she was featured on Home Session  by Apple Music.

In February 6, Msaki unveiled six pieces of her artwork titled Platinumb Heart of Love In Protest and performed at Nirox Sculpture park to promote her double  album.

Msaki and Tubatsi Moloi released joint album Synthetic Hearts on March 10, 2023.

Television 
In early November 2021, she made her screen debut as guest judge on Idols South Africa season 17.

Discography

Studio albums 
 Nal'ithemba (2013)   
 Zaneliza: How The Water Moves (2016)
 Platinumb Heart (2021)

Collaborative albums 
 Synthetic Hearts (2023) (Msaki and Tubatsi)

As featured artist

Achievements

Amapiano Music Awards 

!
|-
|2023
|Herself 
|Friends of AmaPiano
| 
|

Basadi in Music Awards 

!
|-
|2022
|Herself 
|Songwriter of the Year
|
|

South African Music Awards 

!
|-
|rowspan="5"|2022
|"No Rainbow" featuring Da Capo 
|Best Collaboration 
|
|rowspan="4"|
|-
| Herself 
|SAMPRA Artist of the Year
|
|-
|rowspan="3"|Platinumb Heart Open
|Female Artist of the Year
|
|-
|Best Produced Album of the Year
|
|-
|Best Adult Contemporary Album 
|
|

References 

Living people
1988 births
People from the Eastern Cape
Rhodes University alumni
21st-century South African women singers
21st-century guitarists
Xhosa people
South African women record producers
South African songwriters
21st-century women guitarists